The 1976 U.S. National Indoor Open Championships was a men's tennis tournament held at the Wicomico Youth and Civic Center in Salisbury, Maryland in the United States. The event was part of the 1976 USLTA-IPA Indoor Circuit. It was the sixth edition of the tournament and was held from February 14 through February 22, 1976, and played on indoor carpet courts. Second-seeded Ilie Năstase won the singles title and earned $9,000 first-prize money.

Finals

Singles
 Ilie Năstase defeated  Jimmy Connors 6–2, 6–3, 7–6(9–7)
 It was Năstase's 2nd singles title of the year, and the 55th of his career.

Doubles
 Fred McNair /  Sherwood Stewart defeated  Steve Krulevitz /  Trey Waltke 6–3, 6–2

References

External links
 ITF tournament edition details

Tennis tournaments in the United States
Salisbury, Maryland
U.S. National Indoor Tennis Championships
U.S. National Indoor Tennis Championships
U.S. National Indoor Tennis Championships